Boğaziçi is a town (belde) in the Düzce District, Düzce Province, Turkey. Its population is 2,825 (2022).

References

Populated places in Düzce District
Towns in Turkey